Hypodactylus fallaciosus is a species of frog in the family Strabomantidae.
It is endemic to Peru.
Its natural habitat is subtropical or tropical moist montane forests.

References

fallaciosa
Amphibians of Peru
Endemic fauna of Peru
Taxonomy articles created by Polbot
Amphibians described in 2000